Transnational eSolutions, Inc., also known as TeSI, is a Philippine-based e-Commerce Company. It is a member of the Transnational Diversified Group of Companies (TDG), an entity with over 30 member companies with business interests which include Air and Travel, Shipping and Ship Management, Logistics, BPO, and ICT.

TeSI focuses on building e-commerce platforms for businesses and consumers. tripmoba.com is its first project in the Philippine market followed by Argomall.com

tripmoba.com 

Tripmoba.com is the first Filipino online travel site focused in traveling to, from, or within the Philippines. It allows customers to book flights and hotels, access air fares, purchase travel packages, and share trips online.

The name tripmoba is a three-word phrase with Filipino origin. Literally translated, “Trip mo ba?” means “Do you like this?” or “Is this your trip?” According to the Chief Information Officer of TDG, Zaki Delgado, the basis behind calling it “tripmoba,” is to preserve a distinct Filipino flavor but still be identifiable to the international market.

argomall.com 
argomall.com is a Filipino-owned online retailer selling smartphones and other related electronic products in the Philippines. This e-commerce platform also doubles as a comparison site for all available smartphones in the said country.

Argomall.com was founded in November 2015 under the Transnational Diversified Group of Companies. In the following year, Home Credit partnered with Argomall.com which made complete online installment application possible for its customers. Home Credit is a non-bank financial institution that originated in Czech Republic. Moving forward, Argomall.com started accepting cryptocurrencies in 2019 as payment in addition to cash-on-delivery and credit card payment options.

In a report published by the iPrice Group in the second quarter of 2018, foreign players dominate the Philippine e-commerce. The only local player that accelerated is Argomall.com which became the top four most visited e-commerce site in the Philippines in the first quarter of 2019.

References 
Status Magazine Click around the world, Fly away with tripmoba, September 2, 2013.
Balikabayan Magazine Philippine Travel Made Easy as tripmoba.com Launches as First Filipino Online Travel Site, September 12, 2013.
Circuit Magazine Travelling Made Easy, September 15, 2013.
Asian Journal Philippine Travel Made Easy as tripmoba.com Launches as First Filipino Online Travel Site, September 12, 2013.
Inquirer.net Philippine Website Launches Focused Online Travel Engine, October 21, 2013.
TTG Asia New Philippine OTAs Gun for Airline Ticketing, October 22, 2013.
Rogue Magazine  Roam if You Want To,  October 14, 2013.
The Philippine Star Tripmoba.com Lets You Book Everything You Need In One Cool Travel Site, October 5, 2013.
https://www.upsize.ph/ourstories/scene/2017/4/online-travel-sites-you-should-check-out-for-your-next-trip Online Travel Sites You Should Check Out For Your Next Trip, 2018
https://www.spot.ph/newsfeatures/the-latest-news-features/71563/travel-apps-websites-a00171-20170927-lfrm 10 Mobile Apps and Online Sites for the Travel Junkie, September 27, 2017
Amarille, B.N.M and Dungga, J.L.B. (2018, July 12). Argonaut steers tech store to deliver happiness online. BusinessMirror Envoys & Expats. E1.
Gift Ideas for Dads: Samartphone. CNN Philippines. Published 2018-06-15. Retrieved 2019-07-22.
Campos, O. (2018, December 1). Chief Argonaut redefines Philippine e-commerce. Manila Standard. C1.
Juego-Tayo, A. (2019, January 4).  Argomall strikes out on its own. Philippine Daily Inquirer. B6.
Magkilat-Cahiles, B. (2018, November 19). Online consumer electronics shopping platform for PH gaining ground. Manila Bulletin. B2.
The Argomall Experiment: Can an E-commerce site offer specialty retail service? . Entrepreneur Philippines. Published 2018-11-28. Retrieved 2019-07-25.

Specific

Business process outsourcing companies of the Philippines
Companies based in Bonifacio Global City
Online retailers of the Philippines